Appias nero, the orange albatross, is a butterfly of the family Pieridae, that is, the yellows and whites. The species occurs from northern India to the Sunda Islands, the Philippines, Sulawesi and eastwards.  Subspecies Appias nero galba is found in India.

Status
The species is common.

Gallery

References
 

nero
Butterflies of Asia
Butterflies of Indochina
Butterflies described in 1867
Taxa named by Alfred Russel Wallace